Kallawaya, also Callahuaya or Callawalla, is an endangered, secret, mixed language in Bolivia; another name sometimes used for the language is Pohena. It is spoken by the Kallawaya people, a group of traditional itinerant healers in the Andes in their medicinal healing practice living in Charazani, the highlands north of Lake Titicaca, and Tipuani.

Characteristics
Kallawaya is a mixed language.  The grammar is partially Quechua in morphology, but most of its words are from either unknown sources or from an otherwise extinct language family, Pukina.  Pukina was abandoned in favor of Quechua, Aymara, and Spanish.

Kallawaya is also a secret language, passed only by father to son, or grandfather to grandson, or rarely, to daughters if a practitioner has no sons. It is not used in normal family dialogue. Although its use is primarily ritual, used secretly for initiated men, Kallawaya may be a part of everyday conversation between those familiar with it.

Kallawaya was one of the subjects of Ironbound Films' 2008 American documentary film The Linguists, in which two linguists attempted to document several moribund languages.

Bolivians refer to the region where the speakers live as "Qollahuayas," meaning "place of the medicines", because the Kallawaya are renowned herbalists. Since they treat or cure with plants, minerals, animal products, and rituals, peasants refer to the speakers as "Qolla kapachayuh", or
"Kuolla ka paikkoja"
meaning "lords of the medicine bag", or "the places for those dying", as in English "hospital".

References

Further reading

 Aguiló, Federico. Diccionario kallawaya. La Paz, Bolivia: MUSEF, 1991. (Spanish language)
 Bastien, JW. 1989. Differences between Kallawaya-Andean and Greek-European Humoral Theory. Social Science & Medicine. 28, no. 1: 45–51.
 Girault, Louis. Kallawaya: el idioma secreto de los incas : diccionario. [La Paz, Bolivia?]: UNICEF, 1989. (Spanish language)
 Muysken, Pieter (2009). Kallawaya. In: Mily Crevels and Pieter Muysken (eds.) Lenguas de Bolivia, vol. I, 147–167. La Paz: Plural editores. (in Spanish). See also the online edition at Lenguas de Bolivia
 Oblitas Poblete, Enrique, and Jan Szemiński. Lexico Kallawaya. [S.l: Bet Xemex?, 1994. (Spanish language)

External links
 Kallawaya language project and photos of language speakers
 Other ways to spell Kallawaya

Languages of Bolivia
Endangered languages
Ritual languages
Mixed languages
La Paz Department (Bolivia)
Quechuan languages